Bonamia ostreae is a parasitic Rhizaria in the phylum Haplosporidia that can cause lethal infections in shellfish, particularly the European flat oyster, Ostrea edulis. Infection in oysters rarely results in clinical signs of disease and often the only indication of the infection is increased mortality. The Australian flat oyster, Ostrea angasi, has been infected with two similar Bonamia parasites, Bonamia exitiosa and B. roughleyi.

Pathology
The cells of Bonamia ostreae measure 2-3 µm in diameter and are found within the haemocytes of the oyster. Lesions occur with focal infiltration of the haemocytes within the connective tissue of the mantle and gills, and in the vascular sinuses near the digestive gland, intestine and stomach. Infection seems to be correlated to haemocyte destruction and diapedesis.

Epidemiology
A study in the Netherlands of the epidemiology of European flat oysters, Ostrea edulis, infected with Bonamia ostreae showed that the parasite was present throughout the year and was detected in all oyster weight classes. The study analyzed the prevalence relative to O. edulis density, biomass and a range of environmental parameters. Prevalence was greatest in the largest oysters and was higher in spring than in the autumn, perhaps because of the mortality of these shellfish during the summer. Mortality seemed to be correlated with higher water temperatures and oysters seemed to be more susceptible to infection after seasons with lower food availability or lower salinity levels.

Distribution
In Europe, distribution of the parasite is along the Atlantic coast from Spain to Denmark. In the USA it is found on the Atlantic coast in Maine and the Pacific coast from California to Washington.

Research
A study was made in 2001 into the relative susceptibility of different strains of Ostrea edulis to the parasite Bonamia ostreae.

Another study was made in 2004 into the incidence of infection by Bonamia ostrea in different populations of Ostrea edulis.

A study made in 2010 aimed to evaluate the Bonamia spp. infection status of Ostrea stentina in the Mediterranean Sea.

A further study made in 2010 investigated whether the Pacific oyster, Crassostrea gigas, could act as a carrier or a reservoir of Bonamia ostreae and transmit the infection to Ostrea edulis.

References

External links 
 Australian flat oyster, Ostrea angasi with Bonamia parasites.
 Image of Bonamia parasites within haemocytes.

Endomyxa
Parasitic rhizaria
Veterinary protozoology